Carlos Ignacio Rodríguez Flores (born 6 January 1995) is a Chilean footballer who last played for Deportes Colina as a forward.

Career
Universidad Católica were Rodríguez's first team. He was promoted into their squad during the 2013 Primera División of Chile season, appearing for his debut on 15 August during a goalless draw with Palestino in the Copa Chile. In 2016, Rodríguez was loaned to Trasandino of the Segunda División de Chile. Three goals, all three coming in 5–3 defeats to Barnechea and Deportes Santa Cruz, followed in seventeen appearances as Trasandino were relegated.

Career statistics
.

References

External links
 
 Carlos Rodríguez at playmakerstats.com (English version of ceroacero.es)

1995 births
Living people
Place of birth missing (living people)
Chilean footballers
Association football forwards
Club Deportivo Universidad Católica footballers
Trasandino footballers
Deportes Colina footballers
Chilean Primera División players
Segunda División Profesional de Chile players